Mark Chappell is a British sitcom writer and screenwriter. His credits include My Life in Film (for BBC Three), Tony Blair, Rock Star (for Channel 4 Television/V Good Films), Perfect Day, The Millennium (for Five/World Productions), The Increasingly Poor Decisions of Todd Margaret, Flaked, and the fourth series of Cold Feet (for Granada). He is credited for writing the screenplay of the 2022 movie See How They Run.

He attended Marling School, Stroud, Gloucestershire.

References

External links
 

British male screenwriters
British television writers
Living people
People educated at Marling School
British male television writers
Year of birth missing (living people)